Henry Reynolds (1564–1632) was an English schoolmaster poet and literary critic of the seventeenth century.

Born in Suffolk, he is known for two works: Aminta Englisht of 1628, a translation from Tasso, and Mythomystes, a 1632 critical work on poetry considered to be most influenced by the Neoplatonism of the early Italian Renaissance. He was the dedicatee of a 1627 poem by Michael Drayton.

In 1611 he was rumoured to be planning to marry Elizabeth Brydges, and then the widow of a Mr Evans a clerk of Parliament.

Otherwise there is sparse biographical information.

Works
Aminta, Englisht. The Henry Reynolds translation (1972). Edited by Clifford Davidson, appendix by Robert Dean. 
Mythomystes (1972) Scolar Press reprint ,

References

J.N. Douglas Bush, Two Poems by Henry Reynolds, Modern Language Notes, Vol. 41, No. 8 (Dec., 1926), pp. 510–513
A.M. Cinquemani, Henry Reynolds' "Mythomystes" and the Continuity of Ancient Modes of Allegoresis in Seventeenth-Century England, PMLA, Vol. 85, No. 5 (Oct., 1970), pp. 1041–1049
M. Hobbs, Drayton's 'Most Dearely-Loved Friend Henery Reynolds Esq.The Review of English Studies, New Series, Vol. 24, No. 96 (Nov., 1973), pp. 414–428
H.R. Woodhuysen (ed.), The Penguin Book of Renaissance Verse (Penguin Books, 1993).
A.-M. Hartmann, 'While the Winds Breathe, Adore Echo. Henry Reynolds between Neo-Platonic and Protestant Ethics of Myth', in English Mythography in its European Context, 1500-1650 (Oxford University Press 2018), pp. 163 ff (Google, partial preview).

External links

Jacobean and Caroline Criticism

1564 births
1632 deaths
Writers from Suffolk
16th-century English poets
17th-century English poets
17th-century English male writers
16th-century English educators
17th-century English educators
English male poets